

See also

Humongous Entertainment
Humongous Fungus (disambiguation)